Arthrophyllum is one of 36 sections in the genus Hypericum. It contains 5 species and its type species is H. rupestre.

References

Arthrophyllum
Arthrophyllum